Pineapple Island is an uninhabited island in Johor Bahru District, Johor, Malaysia. This island is located between Pasir Gudang and Tanjung Langsat along the Straits of Johor.

See also 
 Geography of Malaysia

Johor Bahru District
Uninhabited islands of Malaysia
Islands of Johor